

Champions
World Series: Chicago White Sox over Chicago Cubs (4–2)

Inter-league playoff:  Chicago (AL) declined challenge by New York Giants.

Awards and honors

Statistical leaders

Major league baseball final standings

American League final standings

National League final standings

Events
May 8 – Philadelphia Athletics manager Connie Mack needed a substitute outfielder in the sixth inning of a game against the Boston Pilgrims and called on pitcher Chief Bender to fill in. Bender hit two home runs, both inside the park.
May 17- Ty Cobb hits a bunt to break up the no hitter being thrown by A's pitcher Rube Waddell. The A's go on to defeat the Tigers 5-0.
July 4 – Mordecai Brown of the Chicago Cubs defeats Lefty Leifield of the Pittsburgh Pirates 1-0, in the first game of a doubleheader, in which both pitchers throw a 1-hitter. Leifield collects the Pirates only hit off Brown and loses his own bid for a no-hitter by giving up a single in the 9th inning that ends up scoring the only run of the game.
July 20 – Mal Eason tosses a no hitter for the Brooklyn Superbas, as they defeat the St. Louis Cardinals, 2-0.
August 1 – Brooklyn Superbas pitcher Harry McIntire would not allow a hit to the Pittsburgh Pirates through 10 innings, only to allow a single with two outs in the 11th inning. McIntire would allow three more hits before the Pirates outlasted the Superbas, 1-0, in 13 innings.
August 3 – At Sportsman's Park, Long Tom Hughes of the Washington Senators and Fred Glade of the St. Louis Browns entered the 10th inning with a scoreless tie, until Hughes decided the game with a solo home run to a 1–0 victory, becoming the first pitcher in major league history to pitch a shutout and hit a home run which accounted for the only run in the game.
September 1 – The Philadelphia A's Jack Coombs and the Boston Pilgrims' Joe Harris each pitch all 24 innings of the A's 4–1 victory over the Pilgrims at Boston's Huntingdon Avenue Grounds. Coombs and Harris still hold the American League record. The major league record is held by the Brooklyn Dodgers' Leon Cadore and Boston Braves' Joe Oeschger, who battled to a 26-inning, 1–1 deadlock on May 1, .
October 14 – In perhaps the greatest upset in World Series history, the Chicago White Sox (93 wins) defeated the Chicago Cubs (116 wins), 8–3, in Game 6, winning the World Championship, four games to two, despite hitting only .198 and committing 15 errors in the series.

Births

January
January 3 – Gus Suhr
January 4 – Blondy Ryan
January 9 – Harry Else
January 19 – Rip Radcliff
January 21 – Glenn Chapman
January 24 – Stu Clarke
January 26 – Charlie Gelbert
January 28 – Lyn Lary

February
February 7 – Art Jones
February 8 – Bruce Caldwell
February 13 – Harry Kelley
February 15 – Bob Cremins
February 18 – Charles Zomphier
February 26 – Joe Graves
February 27 – Leroy Herrmann
February 28 – Al Baker
February 28 – Pete Daglia

March
March 2 – Woody English
March 2 – Mike Powers
March 9 – Hughie Wise
March 10 – Art Herring
March 11 – Bill Lawrence
March 12 – Rusty Saunders
March 12 – Bud Tinning
March 13 – Ike Powers
March 16 – Lloyd Waner
March 17 – Hy Vandenberg
March 21 – Shanty Hogan
March 22 – Marv Owen
March 22 – Moose Solters
March 22 – Overton Tremper
March 24 – Pat Veltman
March 27 – Fred Tauby

April
April 2 – Bob Way
April 6 – Benny Frey
April 10 – Howdy Groskloss
April 13 – Roxie Lawson
April 16 – Tommy Sewell
April 17 – Eddie Delker
April 23 – Ray Starr
April 24 – Red Worthington

May
May 7 – Syd Cohen
May 10 – Gene Connell
May 12 – Charlie Butler
May 17 – Al Eckert
May 21 – Hank Johnson
May 23 – Pat Creeden
May 23 – Willis Hudlin
May 25 – Martín Dihigo
May 30 – Hugh Willingham
May 30 – Norman Yokely

June
June 4 – Doc Marshall
June 15 – Monte Weaver
June 19 – Buck Stanton
June 21 – Randy Moore
June 21 – Art Smith
June 21 – Russ Van Atta
June 23 – Ray Foley
June 25 – Joe Kuhel
June 27 – Dick Terwilliger

July
July 7 – Dick Bass
July 7 – Satchel Paige
July 9 – Johnny Vergez
July 10 – Ad Liska
July 10 – Hal McKain
July 19 – Jackie Hayes
July 28 – Ray Dobens
July 30 – Johnnie Tyler

August
August 1 – Frank Bushey
August 2 – Bill Posedel
August 6 – Ed Crowley
August 6 – Chad Kimsey
August 8 – Tot Pressnell
August 13 – Cliff Garrison
August 13 – Carlos Moore
August 13 – Art Shires
August 13 – Kemp Wicker
August 15 – Red Peery
August 17 – Hub Walker
August 19 – Tex Carleton
August 20 – Lee Riley
August 26 – Elmer Klumpp
August 29 – Jonah Goldman
August 29 – Alex Hooks
August 30 – Bob Friedrichs

September
September 4 – Jim Mooney
September 8 – Frank Stewart
September 13 – Thornton Lee
September 13 – Jim Levey
September 15 – Charlie Biggs
September 15 – Tip Tobin
September 19 – Cap Clark
September 25 – Harris McGalliard
September 27 – John Smith
September 28 – Dick Barrett
September 30 – Frank Lamanske

October
October 5 – Si Johnson
October 11 – Tom Carey
October 12 – Joe Cronin
October 15 – Sammy Byrd
October 17 – Paul Derringer
October 18 – Wally Millies
October 24 – Pete McClanahan
October 28 – Ed Clough
October 30 – Roy Joiner

November
November 1 – Pete Rambo
November 1 – Heinie Schuble
November 2 – Tim McKeithan
November 7 – Alan Strange
November 9 – Fred Brickell
November 11 – George Detore
November 12 – Red Evans
November 15 – Gene Rye
November 16 – Ab Wright
November 17 – Rollie Stiles
November 20 – Joe Ogrodowski
November 23 – Biggs Wehde

December
December 2 – Johnny Welch
December 5 – Lin Storti
December 7 – Tony Piet
December 10 – Bots Nekola
December 15 – Tom Kane
December 15 – Bucky Williams
December 18 – Dick Coffman
December 19 – Tom Sullivan
December 28 – Tommy Bridges
December 30 – Ray Prim

Deaths
January 26 – Fred Underwood, 37, pitcher for the 1894 Brooklyn Grooms;
February 16 – Yale Murphy, 36, shortstop and outfielder who played from 1894 through 1897 for the New York Giants.
February 18 – Charlie Ingraham, 45, catcher for the 1883 Baltimore Orioles.
February 27 – John Peltz, 44, outfielder who played with the Hoosiers, Orioles, Gladiators, Stars and Maunees between the 1884 and 1890 seasons.
March 25 – Joe Cassidy, 23, shortstop for the Senators since 1904 who led AL with 19 triples as a rookie, led league in assists in 1905.
March 27 – Toad Ramsey, 41, pitcher for Louisville who topped 35 wins in both 1886 and 1887, with strikeout totals of 499 and 355.
June 14 – Mike Sullivan, 39, pitcher who posted a 54–65 record and a 5.04 ERA with eight teams from 1889 to 1899.
June 15 – Sandy Nava, 56, catcher and first known Mexican American to play in the Majors.
June 24 – Joe Strauss, 47, left fielder/catcher/pitcher for the Colonels/Cowboys/Grays from 1884 to 1886.
August 16 – Tom Carey, 60, 19th century infielder and player-manager.
October 20 – Buck Ewing, 47, catcher, most notably for the New York Giants, who batted .303 lifetime and led NL in home runs and triples once each; captain of 1888–89 NL champions batted .346 in 1888. championship series; in 1883 was one of the first two players to hit 10 home runs in a season; led NL in assists three times and double plays twice, was later Cincinnati manager.
September – Matthew Porter, 47, player-manager for the  Kansas City Cowboys of the Union Association.
August 31 – Alex Voss, 48, utility for the Nationals and Cowboys in the 1884 season.
September 22 – George Davies, 38, pitcher who posted an 18–24 record and a 3.32 ERA for the Spiders, Brewers and Giants from 1891 to 1893.
November 22 – Tom Cotter, 40, catcher who played six games for the 1891 Boston Reds.
October 25 – Marty Swandell, 65, infielder/outfielder for the Eckfords and Resolutes from 1872 to 1873.
November 22 – Tom Cotter, 40, catcher for the 1891 Champions Boston Reds.
November 27 – Julius Willigrod, 49, outfielder/shortstop who played with the Wolverines and Blues in the 1882 season.
December 19 – Ed Pinkham, 60, third baseman for the 1871 Chicago White Stockings.
December 30 – Henry Porter, 48, pitcher for three teams in the 1880s, who set a major league record for an 18-strikeout game for a losing pitcher in 1884 and also threw a no-hitter in 1888.